Marly is a neighbourhood in the locality of Chapinero in Bogotá, Colombia

History 
The community of Marly was founded in 1903, when a big house named Casaquinta de Marly was sold to a doctor named Carlos Esguerra in the neighborhood of Chapinero, He transformed it into a clinic, one of first modern private clinics of the city and country, associating with Drs. Manuel M. Lobo, Manuel Cantillo, Rafael Ucrós, Luis Felipe Calderón, Miguel Rueda, Rafael Rocha, Juan David Herrera, José María Lombana Barreneche, Julio Z. Torres y Pompilio Martínez.

The area where the clinic was became known as Marly, so the Mayor of Bogotá decided to formally name the barrio Marly, and it became a part of the locality number 2 of the City of Bogotá.

Location 

Marly's borders Bogotá's downtown Centro Internacional de Bogotá to the south, and Central and North Chapinero to the north, including Zona G, the gourmet zone of the city where there are exclusive restaurants, including one of the best in Latin America, Zona T also borders to the north, with luxury commercial areas including boutiques of Louis Vuitton, Gucci, Versace, Longchamp, bars and nightlife including Hard Rock Café and Armando.

To the east is Cerros Orientales a natural area of the Andes, where the ecotourists can hike and camp.

To the west is West Chapinero and Palermo, known for the best sports and events. The Movistar Arena Bogotá has hosted artists such as Demi Lovato, Miley Cyrus and Paul McCartney, and Estadio Nemesio Camacho a soccer stadium, which has hosted shows of Lady Gaga, One Direction, Coldplay, Foo Fighters, U2, Justin Bieber and Bruno Mars.

Economy and culture 

Marly is known in Bogotá for having the most important hospitals of the city, including the Clinica de Marly and the Hospital Militar.

It is a wealthy neighbourhood, between the Avenida Caracas and the Avenida Alberto Lleras Camargo or La Septima.

Points of interest 
The points of interest are of the neighbourhood are the Zona 51 with bars such as Guadalupe Club, Malabar, Soko Bar, Babylon House, Congo..

Parks and open space 

Marly does not have parks or open spaces inside its neighborhood but nearby there are several public parks, plazas, gardens and other open space:
 Central Park Enrique Olaya Herrera
 Sucre || Park 
 Portugal Park
 Hippies Park
 La Salle University Park
 San Luis Park

Transportation 

Marly has more than 20 stations of the SITP, where buses transport from there to another place of the city.

The neighbourhood has the Marly station station and the most important system of the city, the Transmilenio.

Bus Rapid Transit 
 : Marly, Calle 45

Marly Main Line Service

Calle 45 Main Line Service

Bike Paths

Airport 
Bogotá's main airport, El Dorado International Airport is about 13 km. (8 miles) from Marly.

Restaurants and shopping 

Marly has one shopping mall, called Plaza 39, at the south of the neighborhood, featuring Subway, Crepes & Waffles, and other local restaurants and shops.

The neighborhood has some popular restaurants, including McDonald's, The Wings D.C., and Maha, Vegetarian Food.

Also there are a variety options of cafés including Juan Valdez Café, Dunkin' Donuts, Starbucks, Oma Café, Salvo Patria, Calico Cat Café, among others.

Education

Schools
The schools within Marly are:

Public
 Manuela Beltran Technique School

Private
 Champagnat School
 Parochial School Our Lady of Chiquinquirá
 Parochial Liceum Zara Zapata
 John Dalton School
 Chapinero's English Royal School
 New Britanial School

Kindergartens
 El Osito Pelusin Kindergarten 
 Picardy Kindergarten 
 Jumper Frog Kindergarten 
 Bilingual Kindergarten Our Creativity

Military Schools

Private 
 Antonio Ricaurte Militar Institute

Universities

Private 
 Universidad Católica de Colombia
 Universidad Santo Tomás
 Pilot University of Colombia
 Pontifical Xavierian University

Public 
 District University of Bogotá; Faculty of Music

Emergency services

Police Services 
The Policia Nacional de Colombia operates the Chapinero area with the Police Station CAI Chapinero, at the Street 60 #9-12 serving the neighborhood.

Fire Services 
The Chapinero's Firehouse is in the area.

Television, film and entertainment 
For its location in the City Marly has appeared in several TV shows and films.

Exterior scenes from films such as Mile 22 have been filmed in the area. Several episodes of the television show Distrito Salvaje were filmed in Marly.

The neighborhood also do a Cameo in the Netflix TV Show presented by David Farrier Dark Tourist, on the first episode Latin America

Marly has appeared in some local shows and films, including Nickelodeon series Yo soy Franky.

The neighborhood had a shout-out in the song Bogotá by Mauricio & Palodeagua.

References

Neighbourhoods of Bogotá